This is a complete list of riders who have entered a FIM Speedway Grand Prix since 1995.

After 2015 Scandinavian SGP in Stockholm (26 September 2015)

Index

A
  Leigh Adams
  Zoltán Adorján
  Sebastian Aldén
  Stefano Alfonso
  Brian Andersen
  Hans N. Andersen
  Dennis Andersson
  Eric Andersson
  Stefan Andersson
(back to index)

B
  Tomasz Bajerski
  Damian Balinski
  Robert Barth
  Troy Batchelor
  Daniel Bewley
  Kenneth Bjerre
  Lasse Bjerre
  Maksims Bogdanovs
  Craig Boyce
  Bohumil Brhel
  Krzysztof Buczkowski
  Jason Bunyan
(back to index)

C
  Mattia Carpanese
  Armando Castagna
  Krzysztof Cegielski
  Tomasz Chrzanowski
  Hans Clausen
  Aleksander Conda
  Craig Cook
  Nicolas Covatti
  Marvyn Cox
  Jason Crump
   Adrian Cyfer 

(back to index)

D
  Robert Dados (1977-2004)
  Stefan Dannö
  Jonas Davidsson
  Rafał Dobrucki
  Jason Doyle
  Sławomir Drabik
  Aleš Dryml Jr.
  Lukáš Dryml
  Martin Dugard
  Matija Duh (1989-2013)
(back to index)

E
  Freddie Eriksson
  Sam Ermolenko
(back to index)

F
  Matej Ferjan (1977-2011)
  Arnt Förland 
  Billy Forsberg
  Josef Franc
  Guglielmo Franchetti
(back to index)

G
  Tomasz Gapiński
  Jason Garrity
  Charlie Gjedde
  Jacek Gollob
  Tomasz Gollob
  Lars Gunnestad
  Henrik Gustafsson
  Simon Gustafsson
(back to index)

H
  Billy Hamill
  Jarosław Hampel
  Greg Hancock
  Chris Harris
  Gary Havelock
  Christian Hefenbrock
  Csaba Hell
  Chris Holder
   Rune Holta
  David Howe
(back to index)

I
  Niels Kristian Iversen
  Matic Ivačič
(back to index)

J
  Wiesław Jaguś
  Maciej Janowski
  Jesper B. Jensen - see Jesper B. Monberg
  Mikkel B. Jensen
  Michael Jepsen Jensen
  Marian Jirout
  Steve Johnston
  Thomas H. Jonasson
  Andreas Jonsson
  John Jørgensen
(back to index)

K
  Lukasz Kaczmarek
  Brian Karger
  Mikael Karlsson - see Mikael Max
  Peter Karlsson
  Antonín Kasper Jr. (1962-2006)
  Krzysztof Kasprzak
  Edward Kennett
  Peter Kildemand
  Nicolai Klindt
  Niklas Klingberg
  Tommy Knudsen
  Janusz Kołodziej
  Andrzej Korolew
  Dino Kovacic
  Jacek Krzyżaniak
  Rafał Kurmański (1982-2004)
  Matěj Kůs
  Joonas Kylmäkorpi 
(back to index)

L
   Grigory Laguta
  Artem Laguta
  Timo Lahti
  Robert Lambert
  Josh Larsen
  Kai Laukkanen
  Andžejs Ļebedevs
  Franz Leitner
  Fredrik Lindgren
  Ludvig Lindgren
  Antonio Lindbäck
  Peter Ljung
  Mark Loram
  Chris Louis
  Nike Lunna
  Jason Lyons
(back to index)

M
  Leon Madsen
  Michal Makovský
  Mikael Max
  Adrian Miedziński
  Mikkel Michelsen
  Alessandro Milanese
  Václav Milík Jr.
  Christian Miotello
  Jesper B. Monberg
  Artur Mroczka
(back to index)

N
  Peter Nahlin
  Scott Nicholls
  Hans Nielsen
  Jiri Nieminen
  Kauko Nieminen
  Jimmy Nilsen
  David Norris
(back to index)

O
(back to index)

P
  Jurica Pavlic
  Piotr Pawlicki Jr.
  Przemyslaw Pawlicki
  Bjarne Pedersen
  Nicki Pedersen
  Ronni Pedersen
  Mick Poole
  Kasts Poudzuks
  Roman Povazhny
  Piotr Protasiewicz
  Pawel Przedpelski
(back to index)

R
  Lee Richardson (1979-2012)
  Tony Rickardsson
  Morten Risager
  Gerd Riss
  David Ruud
  Adrian Rymel
(back to index)

S
  Emil Sayfutdinov
  Izak Šantej
  Joe Screen
  Zdeněk Simota 
  Nick Škorja
  Dariusz Śledź
  Andy Smith
  Martin Smolinski
  Rune Sola
  Jan Stæchmann
  Simon Stead
  Denis Štojs
  Carl Stonehewer
  Ryan Sullivan
  Linus Sundström
  Antonín Šváb Jr.
  Rafał Szombierski
(back to index)

T
  Simone Terenzani
  Daniele Tessari
  Anders Thomsen
  Sándor Tihanyi
  Luboš Tomíček Jr.
  Tomáš Topinka
(back to index)

U
  Sebastian Ułamek
(back to index)

V
  Martin Vaculík
(back to index)

W
  Grzegorz Walasek
  Darcy Ward
  Davey Watt
  Simon Wigg (1960-2000)
  Todd Wiltshire
  Tai Woffinden
  Mirko Wolter
(back to index)

Z
  Matej Žagar
  Grzegorz Zengota
  Magnus Zetterström
  Bartosz Zmarzlik
(back to index)